Guangdong Nuclear Power Station may refer to:

 Ling Ao Nuclear Power Plant, Dapeng, Shenzhen
 Daya Bay Nuclear Power Plant, Daya Bay, Shenzhen